The brown skink (Oligosoma zelandicum) is a species of skink native to New Zealand.

Distribution  
The brown skink is relatively numerous and is found from Taranaki to Wellington in the North Island and in the Marlborough Sounds, Nelson and Westland in the South Island.

Conservation status 
The brown skink is listed as Least Concern by the IUCN Red List as of 2010. In 2012 the Department of Conservation classified the brown skink as At Risk Declining under the New Zealand Threat Classification System.

References 

Oligosoma
Reptiles of New Zealand
Reptiles described in 1843
Taxa named by John Edward Gray